Eduardo Schwank and Dušan Vemić were the champions in 2009, but he chose to not defend their title.
Colin Fleming and Ken Skupski won in the final 6–2, 6–1, against Daniele Bracciali and Alessandro Motti.

Seeds

Draw

Draw

References
 Doubles Draw

Trofeo Paolo Corazzi - Doubles
Trofeo Paolo Corazzi